Charles Joel Duveen, Sr. (December 23, 1871 – July 21, 1940) was an antique dealer at Charles of London.

Biography
He was born in Hull, England, on December 23, 1871, to Joel Joseph Duveen. His brothers were Joseph Duveen, 1st Baron Duveen, and Henry Joseph Duveen. He married Anna and had as his son, Charles Joel Duveen, Jr.

He died on July 21, 1940, in Yonkers, New York, at St. John's Hospital. He was buried in Ferncliff Cemetery.

References

1871 births
1940 deaths
English emigrants to the United States
Burials at Ferncliff Cemetery